Blue Corn Music is an American blues, Americana, bluegrass, and roots music, independent record label. It was founded in 2001 by label president Denby Auble.

Blue Corn Music celebrated its 10th anniversary on June 21, 2011 at Antone's in Austin, Texas, which featured performances by label artists Ruthie Foster, Hadden Sayers, and the Austin Lounge Lizards.

Roster
Austin Lounge Lizards
The Ballroom Thieves
Sarah Borges
Billy and Bryn Bright
Adam Carroll
Susan Cowsill
Steve Forbert
Guy Forsyth
Ruthie Foster
AJ Ghent
Grupo Fantasma
Caroline Herring
David Lee Holt
Rebecca Loebe
Mingo Fishtrap
Gurf Morlix
John Nemeth
Gary Nicholson
Jeff Plankenhorn
Prairie Fire
Hadden Sayers
South Austin Jug Band
Two High String Band
Wood and Wire

References

American independent record labels
Blues record labels
Bluegrass record labels